BFM Business (called BFM for Business FM until April 2009 and BFM Radio until November 2010) is France's first business news channel. It's also the most-listened to business news radio station in this country. From November 2010, BFM Business is a national economic television station offering regional variation in Ile-de-France. That regional variation was shut down in November 2016 and replaced by a local news channel, BFM Paris.

Founded in 1991 (radio), it has been part of NextRadioTV group since 2002.

Organization

Management 
The chief executive officer is Guillaume Dubois and the assistant CEO is Nicolas Lespaule.

Capital 
BFM Business is held by the French group NextRadioTV which also owns the national news channel BFM TV and RMC radio station.

Broadcasting 
From November 2010 to November 2016, the television station was broadcast in 16:9 format on TNT in the Paris region (channel 24). It is still available by satellite in Western Europe and North Africa via Eutelsat 5 West A, available through Fransat, BiS TV and TV Orange-labeled or not.

By land line in France, the channel is available via ADSL, SD streams, Internet and IPTV, through most operators. It is also distributed by a number of cable networks.

The website offers live streaming and a variety of podcasts (also available on the iTunes Store). BFM is also available on most radios sold in the Internet commerce, streaming.

Presenters 
 Guillaume Sommerer
 Cédric Decoeur
 Grégoire Favet
 Sébastien Couasnon
 Hedwige Chevrillon
 Fabrice Lundy
 Stéphane Soumier
 and others.

Slogan 

December 2002 - November 2010: "La radio de l'économie" (The radio of economy) 
November 2010 - September 2014: "Numéro un sur l'économie" (Number one for economy)
Since September 2014: "La France a tout pour réussir" (France has everything to succeed)

See also 
List of radio stations in France
List of television stations in France

References

External links 
 

Radio stations established in 1991
Radio stations in France
French-language radio stations
Business-related television channels
Television channels and stations established in 2010
Television stations in France
French-language television stations
24-hour television news channels in France